Disney's River Country was the first water park at Walt Disney World. River Country was located along the shores of Bay Lake and near Disney's Fort Wilderness Resort & Campground, the park was themed as a rustic, old-fashioned swimming hole. It opened on June 20, 1976, and closed indefinitely on November 2, 2001, with The Walt Disney Company later announcing on January 20, 2005, that the park would remain closed permanently. This made the water park the second of only two Disney parks in the company's history to close permanently, with nearby Discovery Island on the lake closing in 1999. A new hotel, Reflections – A Disney Lakeside Lodge, was set to be built at the former site of Disney's River Country starting in 2019 and was planned to open in 2022, but construction was halted during the COVID-19 pandemic.

History

Positioned on the shore of Bay Lake, near Discovery Island, the park featured a rustic wilderness theme, complete with rocks and man-made boulders. It was described as an "old-fashioned swimming hole". The original working title was "Pop's Willow Grove". 

The park was featured in a musical number from the 1977 Wonderful World of Disney episode "The Mouseketeers at Walt Disney World", which included a song titled "River Country" and featured the then-current Mouseketeer lineup from the late 70s incarnation of The Mickey Mouse Club enjoying its attractions.

The park featured a sandy bottom and unique water filtering system using confluent water from adjacent Bay Lake, which was dammed off creating a natural-looking artificial lagoon. The park's water was at a higher level than the lake's, which was an effort to prevent lake water from going into the park.

There were several deaths that took place at River Country. The first was of an 11-year-old boy who contracted an amoebic infection of the brain from the water in 1980. Park officials noted that similar amoebic infections also occurred relatively frequently elsewhere and said it was an inherent problem with freshwater lakes in warm weather and thus could not be blamed on the park's water system. Three other children had died similarly in Florida in the same month. The other two deaths were from drowning, in 1982 and 1989.

Closure
In 1989, Disney opened a second water park, Typhoon Lagoon; it had much more parking, many more slides, newer amenities, and was much larger. Six years later in 1995, Disney opened a third water park, Blizzard Beach, which was also much bigger than River Country.
 
The park closed on November 2, 2001, with the expectation that it would reopen in the spring of 2002. On April 11, 2002, the Orlando Sentinel reported that "Walt Disney World's first water park, River Country, has closed and may not reopen." Disney World spokesman Bill Warren stated that River Country could be reopened if "there's enough guest demand".

In 2005, Disney officially announced that River Country would be closed permanently. River Country then sat abandoned for 17 years, rotting and gradually being reclaimed by nature. The water park was fenced off with signs up reading "Sorry, River Country is closed." The park was a popular site amongst urban explorers who climbed over the green fence or even walked in through the backstage driveway.
The River Country Closing Theme still plays even in the abandoned park. Lights are also turned on automatically as Disney appears to not have cut off power to the Water Park. The River Country water tower towards the entrance was removed a few years after closing and moved.

On August 25, 2016, Disney announced that it would drain and fill in Upstream Plunge, the 330,000-gallon pool. There were no immediate plans to tear down any other part of the park.

River Country is one of only two Disney parks to permanently close, along with "Discovery Island", which is situated parallel to the water park. There are many similarities between the two closures, in that both closed permanently within two years of each other, and were also both abandoned and never mentioned by Disney.

Planned hotel
On March 5, 2018, Disney filed permits for a new mystery development labeled "Project 89" to be built along Bay Lake and over the former River Country site. A week later, it was rumored that "Project 89" will most likely be another themed Hotel Resort or DVC timeshare property.

The resort hotel was confirmed on May 31, 2018, and most remaining structures at the park, including the remnants of the Upstream Plunge pool, were demolished on April 20, 2019, to make way for development of the new hotel. Disney later officially announced that the new deluxe resort would be nature-themed and called "Reflections – A Disney Lakeside Lodge." The new resort is slated to have 900 hotel rooms and was set to open in 2022. The new hotel will also feature several Disney characters for each of the rooms including Bambi, Brother Bear, The Fox and the Hound, and Pocahontas among others. A lakeside restaurant featuring the characters from The Princess and the Frog was also slated to open along with the new resort in 2022.

Due to the COVID-19 pandemic, the Walt Disney Parks division has halted all major construction on the Walt Disney World Resort property, including Reflections – A Disney Lakeside Lodge. The 2022 opening date has been delayed or scrapped pending the Walt Disney Company's financial stability going forward. As of mid 2022 construction had completely stopped for now.

List of attractions
Attractions included:

Upstream Plunge, a lung shaped clean-water pool.
Slippery Slide Falls, two water slides that emptied into Upstream Plunge.
Kiddie Cove, a kids zone with two large water slides and a cove. This area was targeted toward preteens.
Barrel Bridge, a bumpy bridge with barrels under it, similar to the one at Tom Sawyer Island.
White Water Rapids, a 330-foot (100 m) long inner tube river.
Bay Cove, a half-acre (2,000 m²) sand-bottom lake which featured a tire swing, boom swing, rope climb, and T-bar drop.
Bomb Swing
Cable Ride
Tire Swing
Whoop 'n' Holler Hollow, two water slides, 260 ft (79 m) and 160 ft (49 m) long, that emptied into Bay Cove.
Bay Bridge
Indian Springs, a very small splash zone with fountains spraying kids. This area was mainly designed for guests under age 8.
Cypress Point Nature Trail, a trail among trees beside Bay Lake.
Pony Rides
Mercury WaterMouse Rental

See also
 List of water parks

References

Further reading

External links
A photo essay  in 2009 of the decaying River Country
Disney's River Country on Modern Day Ruins
A four-part series on the abandoned resort

1976 establishments in Florida
2001 disestablishments in Florida
Defunct amusement parks in Florida
Walt Disney Parks and Resorts
Walt Disney World
Water parks in Florida
Former Walt Disney Parks and Resorts attractions
Amusement parks opened in 1976
Amusement parks closed in 2001